Llandovery railway station serves the market town of Llandovery, Carmarthenshire, Wales.

All trains serving the station are operated by Transport for Wales, who also manage it.

History

It was opened by the independent Vale of Towy Railway company in 1858 as the terminus of a branch from Llandeilo, although the VoTR was soon leased by the Llanelly Railway (which had built the route northwards from Llanelli in stages between 1833 and 1852.) The Llanelly company in turn soon became part of the GWR. The LNWR's Central Wales Extension Railway arrived from the north a decade later to complete the through route between Craven Arms and Swansea, with the LNWR and GWR taking joint control of the Llandovery to Llandeilo section.

The station sits at the bottom of an  descent from the line's southern summit at  tunnel and until August 1964, a locomotive shed was in operation here to house the engines used for assisting northbound trains (the ruling gradient on this section being 1 in 60).

There is a passing loop and level crossing (of the A40 road) at the station, but the signal box that formerly operated them was closed in 1986. The token instruments for the single line and crossing barriers are both operated by the train crew under the supervision of the signaller at Pantyffynnon. The loop had been temporarily decommissioned between 2008 & 2010, but is in use again after the automatic point machines were renewed in June 2010.

Refurbished station buildings were opened by Prince Charles in June 2011, some 19 years after they were closed.

Facilities
The station is unstaffed and has no ticket machine, so all tickets need to be purchased prior to travel or on board the train. There are shelters, CIS screens and customer help points on each platform, whilst a local volunteer group runs a cafe and gallery in the main station building. Step-free access is provided to both platforms.

Services
The extra departures were introduced at the winter 2022 timetable change.

Notes

References
Body, G. (1983), PSL Field Guides - Railways of the Western Region, Patrick Stephens Ltd, Wellingborough,

Further reading

External links 

YouTube video and history of Llandovery Station

Railway stations in Carmarthenshire
DfT Category F1 stations
Former Vale of Towy Railway stations
Railway stations in Great Britain opened in 1858
Heart of Wales Line
Railway stations served by Transport for Wales Rail
Llandovery
Grade II listed buildings in Carmarthenshire
Grade II listed railway stations in Wales